Alonzo Herndon Stadium, named for Alonzo Herndon, is an abandoned 15,011-seat stadium on the campus of Morris Brown College in Atlanta, Georgia, United States. It is the only two-sided stadium in the Atlanta University Center. It is one block over from the locally known Herndon Home, and sits above the MARTA East-West rail line.

The stadium opened in 1948. It is the largest stadium at an institution in the Atlanta University Center, and the only with stands on both sides.

In addition to sports, the stadium hosted concerts. Ray Charles recorded a live album at the stadium.

During the 1996 Summer Olympics, Herndon Stadium hosted field hockey. It was expanded and renovated ahead of the games. It was also used as the stand-in for the demolished Fairfield Stadium in Huntington, West Virginia during filming of the 2006 movie We Are Marshall.

The stadium was the home to the former Georgia Mustangs and the former Atlanta Beat women's soccer club of the WUSA league, the latter of whom played there from 2001 until 2003.

Due to the college's financial hardships, the stadium was abandoned and is in a state of disrepair, gutted by vandals and covered in graffiti and trash. The stadium was sold by Morris Brown College, and was abandoned in 2014. Its sale created controversy due to a land-use agreement with other members of the Atlanta University Center and historic property deeds. The stadium is now own by Clark Atlanta University. The school is planning to restore the stadium.

External links
 Abandoned Football Stadium in Atlanta, Georgia (Alonzo Herndon)

References

 1996 Summer Olympics official report. Volume 1. p. 542.
 1996 Summer Olympics official report. Volume 3. p. 458.

Further reading

 
 

 

Abandoned buildings and structures
College football venues
Morris Brown Wolverines football
Venues of the 1996 Summer Olympics
Olympic field hockey venues
Field hockey venues in the United States
American football venues in Atlanta
Soccer venues in Georgia (U.S. state)
1948 establishments in Georgia (U.S. state)
Sports venues completed in 1948